Austan is a village in Batken Region of Kyrgyzstan. It is part of the Kadamjay District. Nearby towns and villages include Maydan and Pum. Its population was 209 in 2021.

References

External links 
Satellite map at Maplandia.com

Populated places in Batken Region